Hogback Mountain may refer to several places:

 Hogback Mountain (Lewis and Clark County, Montana), List of mountains in Lewis and Clark County, Montana
 Hogback Mountain (Madison County, Montana), List of mountains in Madison County, Montana
 Hogback Mountain (Klamath County, Oregon)
 Hogback Mountain (Vermont)
 Hogback Mountain (Loudoun County, Virginia)
 Hogback Mountain (Shenandoah National Park, Virginia)

See also 
 Hogback (disambiguation)